Benin sent a delegation to compete at the 2008 Summer Paralympics in Beijing, China. They were represented by one athlete, powerlifter Blandine Sahenou.

Team 
Benin participated in the 2008 Summer Paralympics, their third consecutive Games they participated in since making their debut at the 2000 Games.  The country did not earn a medal in Beijing.

Powerlifting

Benin was represented in Beijing by a powerlifter, their second consecutive time that they participated in the sport at the Paralympics. Blandine Sahenou was the country's powerlifter in Beijing.

Women

See also
Benin at the Paralympics
Benin at the 2008 Summer Olympics

External links
International Paralympic Committee

References

Nations at the 2008 Summer Paralympics
2008
Summer Paralympics